Neocottus werestschagini is a species of ray-finned fish belonging to the family Cottidae, the typical sculpins.. It was described by Dmitrii Nikolaevich Taliev in 1935, originally under the genus Abyssocottus. It is a rare freshwater, deep water-dwelling fish which is endemic to Lake Baikal, in Russia.

The diet of N. werestschagini consists of bony fish, gammarids, and debris.

References

werestschagini
Fish described in 1935
Taxa named by Dmitrii Nikolaevich Taliev
Fish of Lake Baikal